Great Trowlesworthy Tor is a granite tor on the southwestern edge of Dartmoor. It is located near the popular Cadover Bridge and is a popular walking destination. It is common for the Dartmoor Pony and other cattle to be roaming around the tor. Little Trowlesworthy Tor, height 330m, is on its western slope and is known to hold a disused flagpole that was used to celebrate Devonport's independence from Plymouth in the 1920s.

References

Tors of Dartmoor
Dartmoor